Wiseman Lumkile Nkuhlu (born 5 February 1944) in Cala, Eastern Cape. Wiseman became South Africa's  first qualified black  chartered accountant. He served as an economic advisory for President Thabo Mbeki from 2000-2004 and chaired the Development Bank of Southern Africa Transmition team from January to May 1995. He is the Chancellor of the University of Pretoria and Chairman of N M Rothschild & Sons in South Africa.

References

1944 births
Living people
People from Sakhisizwe Local Municipality
Xhosa people
Chancellors of the University of Pretoria
Academic staff of the University of Pretoria
Members of the Academy of Science of South Africa
Member of the Mont Pelerin Society